Edward Steven Phillip Shack (February 11, 1937July 25, 2020), also known by his nicknames "the Entertainer" and "the Nose", was a Canadian professional ice hockey player of Ukrainian descent who played for six National Hockey League (NHL) teams from 1959 to 1975. He spent eight and a half seasons of his career with the Toronto Maple Leafs, with whom he won the Stanley Cup in 1962, 1963, 1964, and 1967.

Early life
Edward Steven Phillip Shack was born in Sudbury, Ontario, on February 11, 1937, the son of Ukrainian immigrants Lena and Bill Shack. He had an elder sister named Mary. As a child, he struggled in school due to illnesses between first and third grade that hampered his attendance. Consequently, he stayed illiterate and eventually dropped out altogether. He began working as a salesman for a butcher shop, but left this job to try out with the Guelph Biltmores hockey club; during his time with them, he supported himself with jobs at a meat market and on a coal truck.

Shack met his wife, Norma Givens, when she worked at the Eaton’s across from the Empress Hotel in Peterborough, Ont., where the team held its training camps. The couple married in 1962 and had two children.

Playing career

Shack played junior hockey for the Guelph Biltmores of the OHA for five seasons starting at the age of 15. He had his best season in 1956–57, when he led the league in assists and starred in the Memorial Cup playoffs.

The New York Rangers signed Shack and assigned him to their AHL Providence Reds farm team for half a season. He made the NHL in the 1958–59 season and played two years for the Blueshirts. In 1960, he was to be traded with Bill Gadsby to the Detroit Red Wings for Red Kelly and Billy McNeill, but the transaction was cancelled when Kelly decided to retire rather than accept the trade.

In November of the 1960–61 season, Shack was traded to the Toronto Maple Leafs, where he played seven seasons on the left wing as a colourful, third-line agitator who was popular with the fans despite a lack of scoring prowess. Canadian sports writer Stephen Cole likened Shack's playing to that of "a big puppy let loose in a wide field".

During the 1965–66 season Shack broke out, scoring 26 goals on a line with Ron Ellis and Bob Pulford. His popularity was such that a novelty song called "Clear the Track, Here Comes Shack", written in his honour and performed by Douglas Rankine with The Secrets, reached No. 1 on the Canadian pop charts and charted for almost three months.

Shack was a member of the Maple Leafs' last Stanley Cup-winning team in 1967, although his production fell significantly and he was traded in May 1967 to the Boston Bruins for Murray Oliver and cash. Playing on the right wing on a line with Derek Sanderson and Ed Westfall, Shack's performance rebounded and he scored 23 goals.

Afflicted by injuries, he spent the next four seasons moving among the Los Angeles Kings, the Buffalo Sabres, and the Pittsburgh Penguins. Although he was never a big scorer or playmaker, he was able to score 20 goals three more times during these years, including a career high of 27 in 1970–71 in 11 games with Los Angeles and 56 games with Buffalo. Pittsburgh sold him back to Toronto for the 1973–74 season. He retired after the 1974–75 season.

Post-playing career
After his retirement, Shack was a popular advertising spokesman in Canada, most notably for The Pop Shoppe soft drinks and Schick razors, shaving off his moustache for one of their promotions. He also promoted a small chain of doughnut stores bearing his name. He appeared for a number of years at alumni all-star games. He also revealed he had been illiterate most of his life and subsequently became an advocate for literacy programs in his native Ontario.

Death
Shack died from throat cancer at a hospital in Toronto on the night of July 25, 2020. He was 83 years old. Shack was survived by his wife of 58 years, Norma Givens and their two children.

Achievements
 Shack won the Stanley Cup in 1962, 1963, 1964, and 1967. He scored the winning goal in 1963, famously claiming that he had scored the goal off his backside and was only trying to get out of the way of the shot.
 He played in the National Hockey League All-Star Game in 1962, 1963, and 1964.

Career statistics
Source:

See also
 List of NHL players with 1000 games played

References

External links

 

1937 births
2020 deaths
Boston Bruins players
Buffalo Sabres players
Canadian ice hockey left wingers
Canadian ice hockey right wingers
Canadian people of Ukrainian descent
Deaths from throat cancer
Guelph Biltmore Mad Hatters players
Ice hockey people from Ontario
Los Angeles Kings players
New York Rangers players
Pittsburgh Penguins players
Sportspeople from Greater Sudbury
Stanley Cup champions
Toronto Maple Leafs players